Villel de Mesa is a municipality in the province of Guadalajara, in the autonomous community of Castile-La Mancha, Spain.

With a permanent population of 249, Villel de Mesa is the main village of the Mesa Valley in the province of Guadalajara. The other villages belonging to Guadalajara in the valley are Mochales and Algar de Mesa.

References 

Municipalities in the Province of Guadalajara